Coração Alado (stylized as ❤ Alado) is a Brazilian telenovela produced and broadcast by TV Globo. It premiered on 11 August 1980 and ended on 14 March 1981, with a total of 185 episodes. It's the twenty fifth "novela das oito" to be aired on the timeslot. It is created and written by Janete Clair and directed by Roberto Talma.

Cast

References

External links 
 

TV Globo telenovelas
1980 telenovelas
Brazilian telenovelas
1980 Brazilian television series debuts
1981 Brazilian television series endings
Portuguese-language telenovelas